Hear the Masses is the debut album by Bradley Joseph, (see 1994 in music), a self-produced and self-published release consisting of 10 original instrumental compositions ranging from upbeat piano to orchestral ballads.

It was recorded between world tours with Yanni and Sheena Easton, and Joseph invited most of the Yanni band to contribute.  They include Charlie Adams (drums, percussion); Ric Fierabracci (fretless bass); Jeanette Clinger (vocals), and Grammy-winning violinist Charlie Bisharat.  Other guest artists include Larry Preston (guitar), and Terry Brau — featured on numerous Bradley Joseph recordings — playing trumpet, saxophone, and fluegelhorn.  "It's Bisharat's virtuostic violin that immediately attracts the listener's attention in the opening of 'Rose Colored Glasses'  ...an upbeat song that has driving, forward momentum", states Music Outfitters. The "Gift"  begins as a slow, dour march with vocal expressions by Joseph and Jeanette Clinger, but the tune quickly develops into a "buoyant" piano solo by Joseph. "Friday's Child"  is a "dynamic blend of piano and sax".

Music from this release has been utilized during The Weather Channel's "Local on the 8s" segments including "Rose Colored Glasses", and "Friday's Child" which is included in the 2008 compilation CD, The Weather Channel Presents: Smooth Jazz II

Joseph often references the past when he names his songs and his music is frequently reminiscent of his rural Minnesota roots. "Wind Farmer" was inspired by childhood visits to a relative's farm near Olivia, says Anne Polta of the West Central Tribune.

Track listing
"Rose Colored Glasses" – 3:24
"The Gift" – 4:24
"Friday's Child" – 4:33
"Wind Farmer" – 3:16
"Pictures In My Mind" – 2:29
"Hear The Masses" – 4:44
"The Bridge" – 7:19  
"Goodbyes" – 3:56
"Amala-Dayo" – 2:54
"A Single Step" – 4:40

Credits
Bradley Joseph – keyboards, vocal expressions
Charlie Adams – drums and percussion
Charlie Bisharat – violin
Terry Brau – horns
Jeanette Clinger –  vocal expressions
Ric Fierabracci – fretless bass
Larry Preston  – guitars

Production
All compositions written, recorded, and produced by Bradley Joseph.
Mixed by – Bradley Joseph & Dugan McNeill
Mixed at – Psychic Dog Studios
Mastered by – Clearsong
Creative Direction & Promotion – Dan Jensen
Art & Design – Pat Carney Studios, Inc.
Portrait Photography  – Ann Marsden
Makeup – Cheryl Nick
Inside Cover Photography – John Pederson

Inscribed quote

"Dedicated to my parents -- 'For always trusting my dreams & beliefs.  This album is a reflection of your love'".

References

External links
Official Website
[ Hear the Masses] at Allmusic
Hear the Masses at Discogs
Hear the Masses at Last.fm

1994 debut albums
Bradley Joseph albums